Christina Matthews (born 26 December 1959) is an Australian former cricketer who played as a wicket-keeper and right-handed batter. She appeared in 20 Test matches and 47 One Day Internationals for Australia between 1984 and 1995, including playing at the 1988 and 1993 World Cups. She played domestic cricket for Victoria, Australian Capital Territory and New South Wales.

She is Australia's most capped female Test player, and holds the record for the most dismissals by a wicket-keeper in Women's Test matches.

Matthews has held a number of senior positions in cricket administration in Australia, including from 2011 Chief Executive of the Western Australian Cricket Association, replacing Graeme Wood.

References

External links
 
 
 Christina Matthews at southernstars.org.au

1959 births
Living people
People from Kew, Victoria
Cricketers from Melbourne
Australia women Test cricketers
Australia women One Day International cricketers
Victoria women cricketers
ACT Meteors cricketers
New South Wales Breakers cricketers
Australian cricket administrators
Australian sports executives and administrators
Wicket-keepers